Kevin Wall is an American entrepreneur, investor, activist and Emmy Award-winning producer of global events such as Live Earth, and Live 8.

As the CEO and founder of the investment fund PTK Capital, Wall finances companies focused on social and environmental issues with a commitment to gender equality. He is also the co-founder and co-chairman of Dreamscape Immersive and the chairman of the board for Flipper's Roller Boogie Palace.

His first media company, Radio Vision International, produced international benefit concerts such as USA for Africa in 1985 as well as Human Rights Now! and the Nelson Mandela 70th Birthday Tribute in 1988. Wall was also the executive producer of the FIFA World Cup Kick Off Celebration, Live Earth: The Concerts for a Climate Crisis with former Vice President Al Gore and Live 8, which earned Wall the first Emmy Award for content delivered via the internet in 2006.

Career

Stage One, Inc. 
At 18, Wall moved to Ann Arbor, Michigan, where he started promoting concerts at the University of Michigan and other Midwest colleges. After he was asked to provide a portable stage for a George Harrison show,  Wall founded Stage One, Inc., a portable staging company. Within a few years, Stage One was the provider of lighting, staging, and outdoor production for stadium and arena tours for The Rolling Stones, Led Zeppelin, The Who and other artists.

Radio Vision International 
In 1984, Wall founded Radio Vision International, a company which "pioneered the business of international music video licensing." 

Radio Vision was soon distributing 60 music television programs internationally and worked with nonprofit and philanthropic organizations, such as Live Aid, USA for Africa, the Human Rights Now! Tour, the 70th birthday tribute to South African activist and former president Nelson Mandela and the annual Prince's Trust Rock Gala, sponsored by Prince Charles.

BoxTop, iXL 
In 1994 Wall established BoxTop, a web design company, which was merged with iXL, an Atlanta-based media and internet consulting company, and became vice-chairman. Wall led the strategic acquisition and organization of 42 internet design and consulting companies, building a company with 3,000 employees, 38 offices and annual revenues of more than $400 million.  iXL went public in 1999 and reached a market capitalization of $2 billion within one year.

Live 8 
Wall was the executive producer of Live 8, a series of concerts around the world on July 2, 1985, to raise money and awareness in the fight against poverty in Africa. The Live 8 lineup featured more than 250 musical acts, including Madonna, U2, Destiny's Child, Jay-Z, and Pink Floyd, who performed within 24 hours of one another at concerts on seven continents. Utilizing both legacy and new media, Live 8's live multi-feed webcast attracted an estimated audience of 2 billion people, a then-record for online viewership. As the executive producer of Live 8, Wall won the first Emmy for content delivered via the internet. This was later described as a "tipping point" and the "defining moment" in online content distribution.

Network LIVE, Control Room 
In 2005, Wall created Network LIVE, a joint venture with AEG, AOL, and XM Satellite Radio. In 2006, Wall acquired full control of Network LIVE and renamed it Control Room. Inspired by former Vice President Al Gore and his Oscar-winning documentary, An Inconvenient Truth, Wall co-created Live Earth, a global concert event designed to raise environmental awareness and combat climate change. On July 7, 2007, 150 musical acts, including The Police, Alicia Keys, Metallica, and Kanye West, performed at 11 sites worldwide. The concerts were broadcast globally through television, satellite and terrestrial radio, handheld devices, and the internet. The event set a live-streaming record as 237,000 people watched video coverage from MSN simultaneously.  Live Earth reached a total audience of nearly 1.5 billion people and set live streaming records, with 15 million streams initiated during the live event, and 100 million the following week.

While initially conceived as a one-time event, Live Earth became an advocacy organization, working with corporate, non-governmental, entertainment and political influencers, and other organizations around the world. 

As of 2015, Control Room had created, developed, distributed and/or produced more than 150 events, including the Green Inaugural Ball, the FIFA World Cup Kick off Celebration in 2010, and Gucci’s Chime for Change concert in 2013. Wall's Control Room has won 11 Telly Awards Awards for excellence in a variety of categories, including Education, Information, News, Social Issues, and Videography.

Dreamscape Immersive 
In 2016, Wall co-founded Dreamscape Immersive, an entertainment and technology company, with legendary producer Walter Parkes. Dreamscape Immersive creates story-based full-roam virtual reality experiences which allow as many as six people at once to explore a virtual 3D environment, seeing fully rendered avatars of one another. Wall serves as co-chairman of the company, which received nearly $40 million in investments from film studios, AMC, IMAX, Steven Spielberg, and others.

Flipper's Roller Boogie Palace 
In 2019, Wall founded Category41, which reintroduced Flipper's Roller Flipper's Roller Boogie Palace, a roller skating rink and nightspot that operated in Los Angeles from 1979-81. The new Flipper's opened its first location in New York City's Rockefeller Center in 2022.

Wall co-founded Flipper's with Liberty Ross, whose father opened the original Flipper's in West Hollywood, California, in 1979, and Jimmy Iovine, an American entrepreneur, record executive and media proprietor best known as the co-founder of Interscope Records and co-founder of Beats Electronics. The original Flipper's was dubbed "Studio 54 on wheels".

Craton Equity Partners, Shelter Capital Partners 
Wall was a general partner of Craton Equity Partners, a $242 million green-tech private equity fund,  and was a founder of Sustainable Holdings, a company which weights its holdings based on a company's sustainability score. He also co-founded Shelter Capital Partners, a $175 million venture capital fund focused on companies in the semiconductor, software, and convergence sectors.

PTK Capital 
In 2015, Wall founded PTK Capital, which invests in transformative companies in the entertainment, food and wellness industries.

Personal life 
Wall is married to Susan Smalley, a scientist, author, activist, and professor emeritus at UCLA in the Department of Psychiatry and Biobehavioral Sciences. Smalley serves on the board of Equality Now, a human rights organization dedicated to women and girls. They have three children.

Recognition and awards (partial list) 
Advertising Age Marketer of the Year
Ellis Island Medal of Honor
EMA Outstanding Achievement Award 
GQ Environmental Pillar Award
MIDEM Green Award

Selected credits

References

External links 
PTK Capital
Dreamscape Immersive
Control Room

Living people
Benefit concerts
American venture capitalists
American investors
Year of birth missing (living people)